The 2011 Shakey's V-League (SVL) season was the eighth season of the Shakey's V-League. There were three indoor conferences in 2011 season.

1st Conference 
The Shakey's V-League 8th Season 1st Conference was the thirteenth conference of Shakey's V-League, a collegiate women's volleyball league in the Philippines founded in 2004. The conference started April 3, 2011 at The Arena in San Juan.

The teams were divided into two groups that played a single round robin. Group A was comprised Ateneo, FEU, San Sebastian, Southwestern University, and Lyceum. Group B had Adamson, CSB, University of St. La Salle (Bacolod), UPHSD, and NU. The top four teams in each group advanced to the quarterfinal round. The eight teams were again divided into two groups and played one round. The top two teams in each group advanced to a crossover best-of-three semifinals, winners of the semifinals advanced to the finals which is also a best-of-three series.

Participating teams 

 Final round
 All times are in Philippine Standard Time (UTC+08:00)
 3rd place

|}

 Championship

|}

 Final standings  

 Individual awards

Open Conference 
The Shakey's V-League 8th Season Open Conference was the fourteenth conference of Shakey's V-League, commenced on July 31, 2011 at The Arena in San Juan with four commercial clubs joining regular league teams Ateneo de Manila University, San Sebastian College–Recoletos and University of Perpetual Help System DALTA.

Participating teams 

 Final round
 All times are in Philippine Standard Time (UTC+08:00)
 3rd place

|}

 Championship

|}

 Final standings 

 Individual awards

SEA Club Invitational 
The Southeast Asian Club Invitational commenced on October 27, 2011 at The Arena in San Juan with clubs from Vietnam and Malaysia participating in the four-team tournament that also features local teams Philippine Army and Ateneo. Matches were aired on NBN 4 on a delayed basis.

Participating teams 

 Final round
 All times are in Philippine Standard Time (UTC+08:00)
 3rd place

|}

 Championship

|}

 Final standings

 Individual awards

References 

2011 in Philippine sport